Jamie Gruber, better known by her stage name Jamie deRoy, is an American producer of Broadway plays, and a cabaret, stage, film and TV performer. She has co-produced 60 Broadway shows and 46 off-Broadway shows. deRoy has won eight Tony Awards for her theatre work and was one of the New York Friars Club's first eight female members.

Early life and education 
deRoy was born Jamie Gruber in Pittsburgh, Pennsylvania, where she grew up in the Squirrel Hill neighbourhood. Her mother Aaronel deRoy Gruber was a multimedia artist and her father Irving Gruber was the owner of American Forge and Manufacturing Co. She attended Linden Elementary School and graduated from Allderdice High School in 1963. deRoy then studied drama at Carnegie Mellon University. In 1964 she moved to New York City and enrolled in classes at the American Academy of Dramatic Arts.

Career 
Appearances on:
 Television shows "Alice," "Spiderman" and "Knight Rider"
 Films GoodFellas, Raging Bull, See No Evil, Hear No Evil and Married To It.
 Onstage, deRoy appeared with Rene Auberjonois in The Threepenny Opera, as well as in The Drunkard with musical direction by Barry Manilow.
TV Movie music documentary "Backstage at The Sound of Music" - Jamie deRoy is host

Cabaret 
deRoy's debut performance was at The Living Room in NY city in 1969. One of deRoy's earliest collaborations was with Barry Manilow.

deRoy opened for Joan Rivers in New York and L.A. She was in the first group of eight female members, including Liza Minnelli, Joan Rivers and Brooke Shields to be admitted to the Friars Club.

deRoy appeared at Caroline's at the Seaport, New York in 1988.  In his New York Times review, Stephen Holden wrote "If Joan Rivers were a Manhattan-based cabaret artist, her act might well resemble that of Jamie deRoy, a singer and comedian who appeared at Caroline's at the Seaport on Monday".

deRoy hosts the variety show Jamie deRoy & friends, which airs every other Sunday at 7:30pm on the Manhattan Neighborhood Network. deRoy's show has been running for 29 years.  Guest entertainers have included Christina Bianco, Mike Birbiglia, E. Clayton Cornelious, John Pizzarelli & Jessica Molaskey and Haley Swindal, Larry Gatlin, Tonya Pinkins, Lewis Cleale, Daisy Jopling, and Caroline Rhea, Melissa Errico, Barbara Fasano, Michael Garin, Daniel Rodriguez, and Michael Somerville, among others. deRoy interviews and gives a short bio of each one of her “friends”, then follows a performance. Jamie deRoy & friends variety shows are directed by Barry Kleinbort, and musical director Ron Abel. Jamie deRoy & friends have appeared at Birdland, The Metropolitan Room, Laurie Beechman, West Bank Cafe, and Feinsteins 54 Below. deRoy teamed with Larry Gatlin to present Larry Gatlin and The Gatlin Brothers for her Jamie deRoy & Friends series: Country Meets Broadway. In August 2019, deRoy brought Jamie deRoy & friends variety show to perform at the Milton Berle Room of the Monastery at the Friar's Club. Music and comedy guests included Jared Bradshaw, Steve Hayes, David Buskin, Sophie Buskin, Willy Falk, Angela LaGreca, and Charlotte Maltby.

Recording career 
Jamie deRoy produced nine CDs in the Jamie deRoy & friends series released on the Harbinger and PS Classics labels.

Jamie deRoy shows have benefitted charitable causes including the “Actors Fund: Jamie deRoy & friends Cabaret Initiative,” a program to assist people in the cabaret industry with help for medical needs and concerns.

In 2001, "Grateful" The Songs of John Bucchino by Jamie deRoy & Friends won the MAC statuette for Cabaret in the recording category for various artists.

Album

 Wish on the Moon

Record producer

 Heather Mac Rae - Songs For My Father (record producer)
 Mabel Mercer - Legendary Performers (executive producer)

Jamie deRoy & Friends albums

 Volume 1: The Child in Me
 Volume 2: The Child in Me
 Volume 3: 'Tis the Season
 Volume 4: Family
 Volume 5: Animal Tracks
 Volume 6: When I Grow Up
 Volume 7: The Real Thing
 If I Sing: The Songwriters Album

Broadway co-producer
Jamie deRoy is a producer of Broadway shows as Jamie deRoy, Roxanne Seeman & Jamie deRoy, Jamie deRoy/Catherine Adler/Wendy Federman/Heni Koenigsberg, deRoy/Winkler/Batchelder, deRoy Kierstead, CatWenJam Productions, 42nd.club/The Yonnone Family/Island Productions, deRoy-Winkler, and as deRoy-Carr-Klausner.

deRoy co-produced the following stage productions:

 Frankie and Johnny
 Beetlejuice
 Tootsie
 To Kill A Mockingbird
 Network
 The New One
 The Waverly Gallery
 Ain't Too Proud
 The Ferryman
 The Lifespan of a Fact
 Pretty Woman: The Musical
 Three Tall Women
 Angels In America (Tony Award)
 Once On This Island (Tony Award)
 Meteor Shower
 Latin History for Morons
 The Band's Visit (Tony Award)
 1984
 The Play That Goes Wrong Significant Other
 Sunday in the Park with George
 The Font Page
 An Act of God
 American Psycho
 Bright Star
 Fiddler on the Roof
 China Doll
 Sylvia
 The Gin Game
 The Heidi Chronicles
 The Realistic Joneses
 A Gentleman's Guide to Love & Murder (Tony Award)
 Vanya and Sonia and Masha and Spike (Tony Award)
 Rodgers + Hammerstein's Cinderella
 Nice Work If You Can Get It
 Peter and the Starcatcher
 The Motherfucker with the Hat
 Catch Me If You Can
 Enron
 The Addams Family
 Lend Me a Tenor
 All About Me
 A Behanding in Spokane
 The Miracle Worker
 Ragtime
 Finian's Rainbow
 Desire Under the Elms
 The Norman Conquests (Tony Award)
 Impressionism
 Blithe Spirit
 Speed-the-Plow
 All My Sons
 The Seagull
 Thurgood
 The Country Girl
 November
 Coram Boy
 Jay Johnson: The Two and Only, Chita Rivera: The Dancer's Life, Say Goodnight Gracie

Film co-producer 

Broadway: The Golden Age
Broadway: Beyond The Golden Age

Awards
Tony Awards

 The Ferryman (2018–2019)
The Band's Visit (2017-2018)
 Angels In America (2017-2018)
 Once On This Island (2017-2018)
 A Gentleman's Guide to Love and Murder (2013-2014)
 Vanya and Sonia and Masha and Spike (2012-2013)
 The Norman Conquests (2008-2009)

Broadwayworld Audience Choice Awards

 Once on This Island 
 The Play That Goes Wrong on Broadway

Drama Desk Awards

 Angels in America
 Gentleman's Guide to Love and Murder
 Vanya and Sonia and Masha and Spike
 The Norman Conquests

Drama League Awards

 The Ferryman
 The Waverly Gallery 
 Angels in America
 The Band's Visit
 Gentleman's Guide to Love and Murder
 Vanya and Sonia and Masha and Spike
 Blithe Spirit

Off-Broadway Alliance Awards

 Fiddler on the Roof in Yiddish
 Exit Strategy

References 
Notes

Sources
www.tonyawards.com

Five Carnegie Mellon Alumni Nominated for 11 Tony Awards
www.ibdb.com

Time Out With... Jamie deRoy | New York Lifestyles Magazine
#173 Jamie Deroy, Producer

External links 

 
 
 Jamie deRoy on IBDB

Songwriters from New York (state)
Living people
Writers from New York City
Carnegie Mellon University College of Fine Arts alumni
Jazz songwriters
American jazz songwriters
Jewish American songwriters
Jazz musicians from New York (state)
American women songwriters
21st-century American women writers
Year of birth missing (living people)